Grevillea jephcottii, commonly known as Pine Mountain grevillea, green grevillea or Jephcotts grevillea is a species of flowering plant in the family Proteaceae and is endemic to a restricted area of Victoria. It is a low dense, to tall spindly shrub with narrowly oblong to narrowly elliptic leaves, and clusters of pale lemon or greenish flowers with a purplish style.

Description

Taxonomy
Grevillea jephcottii was first formally described in 1967 by James Hamlyn Willis in the journal Muelleria from specimens he collected on the south-west slopes of Pine Mountain in 1964. The specific epithet (jephcottii), honours the Jephcott family from Ournie, who were the first to collect specimens from the area. Sydney Wheeler Jephcott discovered the plant at the age of 14 in 1878.

Distribution and habitat
Pine Mountain grevillea occurs in a restricted area of north-eastern Victoria between Walwa and Corryong at altitudes ranging between  where it grows in rocky places in dry forest.

Conservation status
The species is listed as "rare in Victoria" on the Department of Sustainability and Environment's Advisory List of Rare Or Threatened Plants In Victoria.

References

External links
Herbarium specimen at Royal Botanic Gardens Kew

jephcottii
Flora of Victoria (Australia)
Proteales of Australia
Plants described in 1967
Taxa named by James Hamlyn Willis